Kenneth Moore, Jr. (born February 19, 1985) is a former American football wide receiver. He was drafted by the Detroit Lions in the fifth round of the 2008 NFL Draft. He played college football at Wake Forest. Moore was also a member of the Carolina Panthers, Indianapolis Colts, Pittsburgh Steelers and Sacramento Mountain Lions.

Early years
Moore played high school football at Butler High School in Matthews, North Carolina.

College career
Kenneth Moore earned All-Atlantic Coast Conference honors as a senior in 2007, as he set league and school single-season records with 98 receptions, good for 1,011 yards (10.3 avg) and five touchdowns. Serving as the full-time punt returner, he gained 355 yards with a score on 34 attempts (10.4 avg). He ranked third on the team with 44 carries for 316 yards (7.2 avg) and three touchdowns. He also had 10 kickoff returns for 172 yards (17.2 avg), made a pair of solo tackles and ranked second in the ACC with an average of 142.62 all-purpose yards per game.

Professional career

Carolina Panthers
After his release from the Detroit Lions, Moore spent much of the 2008 season on the practice squad for the Carolina Panthers.  His play in training camp and the exhibition season earned him a roster spot with the Panthers for the 2009 season. Moore is the first native Charlottean to play a regular season game for the Panthers.  Moore was waived by the Panthers on September 4, 2010.

Indianapolis Colts
Moore was signed by the Indianapolis Colts on October 5, 2010 after kick returner Devin Moore was injured.  He was waived by the Indianapolis Colts on October 19, after fumbling twice against the Washington Redskins on October 17.

Pittsburgh Steelers
On August 10, 2011, Moore signed with the Pittsburgh Steelers, after they waived/injured rookie receiver Adam Mims. Moore was waived on August 28.

References

External links

 Just Sports Stats
 Wake Forest Demon Deacons bio

1985 births
Living people
Players of American football from Charlotte, North Carolina
American football running backs
American football wide receivers
Wake Forest Demon Deacons football players
Detroit Lions players
Carolina Panthers players
Indianapolis Colts players
Pittsburgh Steelers players
Sacramento Mountain Lions players